John Edward Blakeney (7 December 1824 – 12 January 1895) was an Anglican priest in the 19th century.
 
He was educated at Trinity College, Dublin and ordained in 1849. After a curacy at Christ Church Claughton he became Vicar of St Paul, Sheffield in 1860. He was Archdeacon of Sheffield from 1884 until his death.

Family
His only daughter, Martha Susan Blakeney, married in 1880 Samuel Roberts, later Lord Mayor of Sheffield, MP for Sheffield, and created a Baronet.

References

1824 births
Alumni of Trinity College Dublin
19th-century Irish Anglican priests
Archdeacons of Sheffield
1895 deaths